Spaulding can refer to:

People 
 Spaulding (surname)

Places 
United States
 Camp Spaulding, California
 Spaulding, California
 Spaulding, Illinois
 Spaulding Mountain, Maine
 Spaulding Township, Michigan
 Spaulding, Oklahoma
 Spaulding, Wisconsin

Other uses 
 Spaulding (automobile)
 Spaulding Rehabilitation Hospital, Boston, Massachusetts, USA
 Spaulding Turnpike in New Hampshire, USA
 Spaulding Wooden Boat Center, a non-profit living history museum in Sausalito, California

See also 
 Spalding (disambiguation)